Luis Javier Suárez Charris (born 2 December 1997) is a Colombian professional footballer who plays as a centre-forward for La Liga club Almería, on loan from Ligue 1 club Marseille, and the Colombia national team.

Club career
Born in Santa Marta, Suárez made his senior debut with Leones on 5 October 2015, coming on as a second-half substitute in a 1–3 Categoría Primera B away loss against América de Cali. The following 1 March, after eight first-team appearances, he was loaned to Granada CF until 2017 with a buyout clause, and was assigned to the reserves in Segunda División B.

On 17 July 2017, after having his federative rights assigned to Watford, Suárez was loaned to Real Valladolid B in the third division for a year. The following 9 July, after scoring 11 goals, he joined Segunda División side Gimnàstic de Tarragona also in a temporary deal.

Suárez made his professional debut on 20 August 2018, replacing Tete Morente late into a 1–1 home draw against Tenerife. He scored his first goal on 7 October, netting the equalizer in a 1–1 draw at Cádiz.

On 21 June 2019, Suárez was loaned to Real Zaragoza, still in the Spanish second division. He ended the regular season with 19 goals, being the team's top goalscorer, but was not allowed to play in the play-offs as his loan ended.

On 2 October 2020, Suárez returned to Granada on a five-year contract, for a fee of £10 million.

On 18 July 2022, Marseille in France announced Suárez's transfer. On 5 December, however, he returned to Spain and its top flight after agreeing to a loan deal with Almería, with a buyout clause.

Career statistics

Club

International

References

External links
 
 
 

1997 births
Living people
People from Santa Marta
Colombian footballers
Association football forwards
Categoría Primera B players
Leones F.C. footballers
La Liga players
Segunda División players
Segunda División B players
Ligue 1 players
Club Recreativo Granada players
Real Valladolid Promesas players
Gimnàstic de Tarragona footballers
Real Zaragoza players
Granada CF footballers
UD Almería players
Watford F.C. players
Olympique de Marseille players
Colombian expatriate footballers
Colombian expatriate sportspeople in Spain
Colombian expatriate sportspeople in England
Colombian expatriate sportspeople in France
Expatriate footballers in Spain
Expatriate footballers in England
Expatriate footballers in France
Colombia international footballers
Sportspeople from Magdalena Department